Norbert Bogdan Redkie (born December 30, 1985, in Warsaw, Poland) is a Polish entrepreneur, restaurateur, lecturer, and film producer. He is a co-founder of a restaurant company Grupa Warszawa, which runs local clubs, bars, and restaurants in Warsaw, and produces feature films in a production studio Mental Disorder 4.

Career 
Redkie studied law, finance, cultural studies, and media. He is a graduate of blockchain studies at the University of Oxford. He lectures on banking and digital finance at the Kraków University of Economics, and at the Faculty of Management of the University of Warsaw.

Grupa Warszawa 
In 2008, at age 22, Redkie founded the Grupa Warszawa, with the intention of “creating a kiosk with vodka and culture”. After winning a call for bids, the company opened a café-bar in an inactive modernist ticket-office building of a suburban railway station Warszawa Powiśle, leased from the Polish State Railways. In 2013, Gazeta Wyborcza hailed the bar as one of the “10 Pubs That Changed Warsaw.”

In 2009, Redkie was joined by Bartłomiej Kraciuk, and Hubert Karsz in 2012. The company opened a live music cocktail bar Syreni Śpiew [Mermaid Singing] (2010–2016), located in a renovated pavilion of the former communist-party-owned hotel restaurant, and from September 2019, at the complex Praga Koneser Center.

The bar was followed by the patisserie Lody na Patyku (2012–2013), the cocktail bar Weles (from 2015), the bistro Zorza (2015–2019), the restaurant Biała – Zjedz i wypij (2016–2020), the cafe Moderna (2012–2014), the restaurant Fokim (2016–2019), and the bar Ruszt (from 2017). Between 2013–2015, it ran a pavilion Stacja Mercedes. Redkie also runs the art foundation Fundacja Więcej Sztuki, and the convention center Szarotka.

Film production 
As part of the Grupa Warszawa, Redkie and Kraciuk, with producer Agnieszka Kurzydło founded a film production studio Mental Disorder 4. The studio's credits include Baby Blues (2012), In the Name of... (2013), Kebab and Horoscope (2014), The Red Spider (2015), The Test (2015), 16.03 (2016), Fugue (2018), and Via Carpatia (2018), as well as international co-productions, including The Red Captain (2016).

Technological projects 
In 2013, Redkie co-founded a mobile game company Swapp, and in 2016, he launched Trust Holding to produce a blockchain-based trading platform for managing restaurants.

Awards and accolades 

Redkie was included twice in Brief magazine's list of “50 Most Creative People in Business,” in 2013, and 2014. Along with Grupa Warszawa co-creators, Redkie was awarded by the Design Alive magazine's readers Strategist prize for 2016.

The Warszawa Powiśle was awarded as “The Opening of the Year,” by TVN Warszawa, and the Nocne Marki award for “The Place of the Year 2009,” by Aktivist magazine. The Syreni Śpiew won the Warsaw Insider magazine award for 2012, as “The Best New Bar.” The Stacja Mercedes project was awarded in Golden Arrow, and Golden Clips competitions. The Weles cocktail bar won the Best Cocktail Bar award in Warsaw Insider magazine's competition.

At the 63rd Berlin International Film Festival in 2013, the film In the Name Of produced by MD4, was awarded the Teddy Award as the best queer film. Baby Blues was awarded by a teenage jury with the Crystal Bear, the main prize of the Generation 14Plus section.

Publications 

 Redkie N., “Impact of Psychological Mechanisms on the Receipt of ICO, IEO and STO Offers by Investors,” in: Bankowość emocjonalna. Cyfrowa transformacja banków a oczekiwania klientów [Emotional Banking. Digital Transformation of Banks, and Customer Expectations]; edited by Ewa Miklaszewska, Mateusz Folwarski; Wydawnictwo Poltext, 2018;

References 

1985 births
Living people
Businesspeople from Warsaw
Polish business executives